Stylia or Stilia may refer to several villages in Greece:

Stylia, Aetolia-Acarnania, a village in the municipal unit Pyllini, Aetolia-Acarnania
Stilia, Phocis, a village in Phocis
Stylia, Corinthia, a village in the municipal unit Xylokastro, Corinthia